Cowboys and Angels may refer to:
"Cowboys and Angels" (George Michael song), from the album Listen Without Prejudice Vol. 1
"Cowboys and Angels" (Dustin Lynch song)
Cowboys & Angels, a 2003 film